Paul Michael Gaustad (born February 3, 1982) is an American former professional ice hockey centerman who played for the Nashville Predators and Buffalo Sabres of the National Hockey League (NHL). He is nicknamed "Goose."

Playing career

Junior
Gaustad was drafted in the seventh round, 220th overall, by the Buffalo Sabres in the 2000 NHL Entry Draft. In the off-season, he lives in Portland, Oregon. He also played for the Portland Winter Hawks of the Western Hockey League (WHL).

Prior to joining Portland in 1999–2000, Gaustad was a Portland Jr. Hawk. Afterward, Gaustad started playing for a Tier II team in Burnaby, British Columbia, of the British Columbia Junior Hockey League (BCJHL). In his three seasons with the Winter Hawks, he registered 135 points (53 goals and 82 assists) before making his professional debut with the Sabres' American Hockey League (AHL) affiliate, the Rochester Americans, in 2002–03.

Professional

Upon his arrival in Rochester, Gaustad registered 53 points (14 goals and 39 assists) in 80 games while also seeing his first action with the parent club, the Buffalo Sabres.

In the 2005–06 season, Gaustad secured a starting position with the Sabres, where he played mostly as fourth line center and played the power forward/enforcer role, along with teammates Adam Mair and Andrew Peters. Gaustad, who had worn the number 14 in Rochester, had to double his number to 28 in Buffalo, due to 14 being retired in honor of Sabres legend René Robert.

On February 7, 2007, in a game against the Ottawa Senators, Gaustad's leg was cut and his tendon was sliced in a collision with Dany Heatley, an injury which at the time was thought to have ended his season. It was later revealed that the injury could have even potentially ended his career had it been an inch deeper. However, he did recover ahead of schedule and joined the Sabres in their 2007 Stanley Cup playoffs on May 4, 2007, for Game 5 against the New York Rangers at home in Buffalo.

After a productive campaign during the 2007–08 season, in which he registered a solid 36 points while mainly on the third and fourth lines, Gaustad was re-signed by the Sabres to a four-year, $9.2 million contract extension on the eve of the free agency period, which was set for July 1, 2008.

On the ice, Gaustad is known for his teamwork and gritty play making him a popular favorite among fans. He is often in front of the net, capitalizing on his 6'5" frame to screen opposition goaltenders and deflect goals. Because of his size and ability, he typically plays a unit on the power play.

At the 2012 NHL trade deadline, on February 27, Gaustad and a 2013 fourth-round draft pick (Juuse Saros) were sent to the Nashville Predators in exchange for a 2012 first-round pick.

On September 8, 2016, Gaustad announced his retirement from the NHL after 12 seasons via his Instagram account.

Personal life
Gaustad was born in Fargo, North Dakota and moved to Portland, Oregon at a young age, which he considers his hometown.

Career statistics

Regular season and playoffs

International

References

External links

1982 births
Living people
American men's ice hockey centers
Buffalo Sabres draft picks
Buffalo Sabres players
Ice hockey people from North Dakota
Ice hockey people from Oregon
Nashville Predators players
Sportspeople from Fargo, North Dakota
Portland Winterhawks players
Rochester Americans players
Sportspeople from Portland, Oregon